The 5th Ersatz Division (5. Ersatz-Division) was a unit of the German Army, in World War I. The division was formed in June 1915 as a temporary division known as the Division Basedow, named after its commander, Heino von Basedow. It was formed from two previously independent Brigades: 37th Mixed Landwehr and 2nd Reserve Ersatz. The division was converted into the 5th Ersatz Division in June 1916. The 5th Ersatz Division was disbanded in 1919, during the demobilization of the German Army after World War I.

Combat chronicle

The division initially occupied defensive positions in the Yser region. In October 1916, it entered the Battle of the Somme. Thereafter, it occupied positions in the Champagne region until December 1916, when it was transferred to the Eastern Front. It fought in Lithuania until the armistice on the Eastern Front, and then carried out garrison duties in Estonia and Latvia until February 1919. Allied intelligence rated the division as fourth class, with only moderate fighting value.

Order of battle on June 3, 1915

The order of battle of the Division Basedow on June 3, 1915, was as follows:

2.Reserve-Ersatz-Brigade
Reserve-Ersatz-Infanterie-Regiment Nr. 3
Reserve-Ersatz-Infanterie-Regiment Nr. 4
37.Landwehr-Brigade
Landwehr-Infanterie-Regiment Nr. 73
Landwehr-Infanterie-Regiment Nr. 74
2.Landwehr-Eskadron/VIII. Armeekorps
2.Landwehr-Eskadron/X. Armeekorps
2.Landwehr-Eskadron/I. Bayerisches Armeekorps
2.Landsturm-Eskadron/II. Bayerisches Armeekorps
Ersatz-Abteilung/2. Hannoversches Feldartillerie-Regiment Nr. 26
3.Kompanie/2. Westfälisches (Festungs-) Pionier-Bataillon Nr. 24
2.Landsturm-Pionier-Kompanie/IX. Armeekorps

Order of battle on November 15, 1916

The order of battle of the 5th Ersatz Division on November 15, 1916, was as follows:

37.Landwehr-Brigade
Landwehr-Infanterie-Regiment Nr. 73
Landwehr-Infanterie-Regiment Nr. 74
Reserve-Ersatz-Infanterie-Regiment Nr. 3
1.Eskadron/2. Hannoversches Dragoner-Regiment Nr. 16
Feldartillerie-Abteilung Nr. 102
2.Landsturm-Pionier-Kompanie/IX. Armeekorps
Minenwerfer-Kompanie Nr. 405

Order of battle on January 1, 1918

The 5th Ersatz Division's order of battle on January 1, 1918, was as follows:

37.Landwehr-Brigade
Landwehr-Infanterie-Regiment Nr. 73
Landwehr-Infanterie-Regiment Nr. 74
Landsturm-Infanterie-Regiment Nr. 8
1.Eskadron/2. Hannoversches Dragoner-Regiment Nr. 16
Feldartillerie-Abteilung Nr. 102
2.Landsturm-Pionier-Kompanie/IX. Armeekorps
Minenwerfer-Kompanie Nr. 405
Divisions-Nachrichten-Kommandeur 6

References
 5. Ersatz-Division (Chronik 1914/1917) - Der erste Weltkrieg
 Division Basedow (Chronik 1915/1916) - Der erste Weltkrieg
 Hermann Cron et al., Ruhmeshalle unserer alten Armee (Berlin, 1935)
 Hermann Cron, Geschichte des deutschen Heeres im Weltkriege 1914-1918 (Berlin, 1937)
 Günter Wegner, Stellenbesetzung der deutschen Heere 1815-1939. (Biblio Verlag, Osnabrück, 1993), Bd. 1
 Histories of Two Hundred and Fifty-One Divisions of the German Army which Participated in the War (1914-1918), compiled from records of Intelligence section of the General Staff, American Expeditionary Forces, at General Headquarters, Chaumont, France 1919 (1920)

Notes

Infantry divisions of Germany in World War I
Military units and formations established in 1915
Military units and formations disestablished in 1919
1915 establishments in Germany